Alexander Hernandez (born October 1, 1992) is an American mixed martial artist currently competing in the Featherweight division of the Ultimate Fighting Championship.

Background
Hernandez began wrestling at the age of 13 and started training in other martial arts as he progressed through education. After graduating from Reagan High School, Alexander entered college from where he graduated with a Bachelor's degree in Business Finance from the University of Texas at San Antonio. Hernandez worked as a mortgage loan officer as he was recovering from a MCL and meniscus injury.

Mixed martial arts career

Early career
Hernandez compiled an amateur MMA record of 3–0 before making his professional debut in the spring of 2012.

He competed for various regional promotions such as Legacy Fighting Alliance and Resurrection Fighting Alliance and by 2018, he had amassed a 8–1 MMA record before signing with the UFC in early 2018.

Ultimate Fighting Championship
Hernandez made his promotional debut as a short notice replacement filling in for Bobby Green against Beneil Dariush on March 3, 2018, at UFC 222. Hernandez won the fight via knockout in the fight's opening minute. He was awarded a $50,000 bonus for Performance of the Night.

Hernandez next faced Olivier Aubin-Mercier on July 28, 2018, at UFC on Fox 30. Hernandez won the fight by pushing a high-pace, scoring takedowns, strikes and successful top game to take a unanimous decision.

Hernandez was expected to face Francisco Trinaldo on January 26, 2019, at UFC 233. However, Hernandez was pulled from that fight in favor of a bout with former UFC Lightweight Championship challenger Donald Cerrone a week earlier at UFC Fight Night: Cejudo vs. Dillashaw. He lost the fight via TKO in the second round. For their performance, both participants were awarded Fight of the Night.

Hernandez faced Francisco Trinaldo on July 20, 2019, at UFC on ESPN 4, which took place in Hernandez's home state of Texas. He won the fight via unanimous decision. The fight was the subject of much debate, with 11 of 13 media outlets scoring the bout in favor of Trinaldo.

Hernández was expected to face Islam Makhachev on April 18, 2020, at UFC 249. However, Russia restricted air travel due to the COVID-19 pandemic, Makhachev was removed from the event and he was replaced by Omar Morales. However, on April 9, Dana White, the president of UFC announced that this event was postponed and rescheduled to May 13, 2020, at UFC Fight Night: Smith vs. Teixeira facing Drew Dober instead. He lost the fight via technical knockout in round two.

Hernández faced Chris Gruetzemacher on October 31, 2020, at UFC Fight Night 181. He won the fight via knockout in the first round. This win earned him Performance Fight of the Night award.

Hernández faced Thiago Moisés on February 27, 2021, at UFC Fight Night 186. He lost the fight via unanimous decision.

Hernández was scheduled to face Leonardo Santos on October 2, 2021, at UFC Fight Night 193. However, Santos was forced to pull from the event, citing calf injury and he was replaced by Mike Breeden. At the weigh-ins, Mike Breeden weighed in at 158.5 pounds, two and a half pounds over the lightweight non-title fight limit. The bout proceeded at catchweight and Breeden was fined 20% which went to  Hernandez. Hernandez won the fight via knockout in round one.

Hernández faced Renato Moicano on February 12, 2022, at UFC 271. He lost the bout via rear-naked choke in the second round.

Hernandez faced Billy Quarantillo on December 10, 2022 at UFC 282. He lost the fight via technical knockout in round two.

Hernandez faced Jim Miller, replacing Gabriel Benítez on February 18, 2023, at UFC Fight Night 219. He won the fight via unanimous decision.

Championships and accomplishments

Mixed martial arts
Ultimate Fighting Championship
Performance of the Night (Two time)  
Fight of the Night (One time) vs. Donald Cerrone
Hero Fighting Championship
 Hero FC Lightweight Champion (One time)
MMADNA.nl
2018 UFC Debut of the Year.

Mixed martial arts record

|-
|Win
|align=center|14–6
|Jim Miller
|Decision (unanimous)
|UFC Fight Night: Andrade vs. Blanchfield
|
|align=center|3
|align=center|5:00
|Las Vegas, Nevada, United States
|
|- 
|Loss
|align=center|13–6
|Billy Quarantillo
|TKO (knees and punches)
|UFC 282
|
|align=center|2
|align=center|4:30
|Las Vegas, Nevada, United States
|
|-
|Loss
|align=center|13–5
|Renato Moicano
|Submission (rear-naked choke)
|UFC 271
|
|align=center|2
|align=center|1:23
|Houston, Texas, United States
|
|-
|Win
|align=center|13–4
|Mike Breeden
|KO (punch)
|UFC Fight Night: Santos vs. Walker
|
|align=center|1
|align=center|1:20
|Las Vegas, Nevada, United States
|
|-
|Loss
|align=center|12–4
|Thiago Moisés
|Decision (unanimous)
|UFC Fight Night: Rozenstruik vs. Gane
|
|align=center|3
|align=center|5:00
|Las Vegas, Nevada, United States
|
|-
|Win
|align=center|12–3
|Chris Gruetzemacher
|KO (punches)
|UFC Fight Night: Hall vs. Silva
|
|align=center|1
|align=center|1:46
|Las Vegas, Nevada, United States
|
|-
|Loss
|align=center|11–3
|Drew Dober
|TKO (punches)
|UFC Fight Night: Smith vs. Teixeira
|
|align=center|2
|align=center|4:25
|Jacksonville, Florida, United States
|
|-
|Win
|align=center|11–2
|Francisco Trinaldo
|Decision (unanimous)
|UFC on ESPN: dos Anjos vs. Edwards 
|
|align=center|3
|align=center|5:00
|San Antonio, Texas, United States
|
|-
|Loss
|align=center|10–2
|Donald Cerrone
|TKO (head kick and punches)
|UFC Fight Night: Cejudo vs. Dillashaw 
|
|align=center|2
|align=center|3:43
|Brooklyn, New York, United States
|
|-
|Win
|align=center|10–1
|Olivier Aubin-Mercier
|Decision (unanimous)
|UFC on Fox: Alvarez vs. Poirier 2 
|
|align=center|3
|align=center|5:00
|Calgary, Alberta, Canada
|
|-
|Win
|align=center|9–1
|Beneil Dariush
|KO (punch)
|UFC 222
|
|align=center|1
|align=center|0:42
|Las Vegas, Nevada, United States
|
|-
|Win
|align=center|8–1
|Derrick Adkins
|TKO (punches)
|LFA 27
|
|align=center|3
|align=center|1:53
|Shawnee, Oklahoma, United States
|
|-
|Win
|align=center| 7–1
|Chris Pecero
|Submission (rear-naked choke)
|RFA 41
|
|align=center|1
|align=center|1:27
|San Antonio, Texas, United States
|
|-
|Win
| align=center| 6–1
| Rodrigo Sotelo Jr.
| Submission (rear-naked choke)
| Hero FC: Best of the Best 6
| 
| align=center| 1
| align=center| 4:44
| El Paso, Texas, United States
|
|-
|Win
| align=center| 5–1
| Jacob Capelli
| Decision (unanimous)
| Hero FC : Best of the Best 4
| 
| align=center| 3
| align=center| 3:00
| Brownsville, Texas, United States
|
|-
| Win
| align=center| 4–1
| Martin Walker
| TKO (punches)
| Hero FC: Best of the Best 3
| 
| align=center| 1
| align=center| 2:59
| Brownsville, Texas, United States
|
|-
| Win
| align=center| 3–1
| Joel Scott
| Decision (unanimous)
| Hero FC: Texas Pride
| 
| align=center| 3
| align=center| 3:00
| Beaumont, Texas, United States
|
|-
| Loss
| align=center| 2–1
| Jamall Emmers
| Decision (split) 
| Hero FC: Pride of the Valley 2
| 
| align=center| 3
| align=center| 5:00
| Pharr, Texas, United States
|
|-
| Win
| align=center| 2–0
| David Salazar
| TKO (punches)
| El Orgullo del Valle
| 
| align=center| 1
| align=center| 0:34
| Pharr, Texas, United States
|
|-
| Win
| align=center| 1–0
| Dimitre Ivy
| Decision (unanimous)
| Kickass Productions
| 
| align=center| 3
| align=center| 3:00
| Seguin, Texas, United States
|
|-

See also
 List of current UFC fighters

References

External links
 
 

1992 births
Living people
American male mixed martial artists
Lightweight mixed martial artists
Mixed martial artists utilizing wrestling
Mixed martial artists utilizing Brazilian jiu-jitsu
Mixed martial artists from Missouri
Sportspeople from St. Louis
Sportspeople from New Braunfels, Texas
University of Texas at San Antonio alumni
Ultimate Fighting Championship male fighters
American practitioners of Brazilian jiu-jitsu
People awarded a black belt in Brazilian jiu-jitsu